Eilika of Schweinfurt (c. 1005 – after 10 December 1059) was Duchess consort of Saxony. 

She came from a Bavarian noble family as the daughter of Margrave Henry of Schweinfurt and Gerberga of Gleiberg (970 – aft. 1036).

Around 1020, Eilika married Bernard II, Duke of Saxony and was mother of:

Ordulf, Duke of Saxony (1022 – 1072)
Herman (d. 1086)
Gertrude (d. 1115), married Floris I, Count of Holland in 1050 and Robert I, Count of Flanders in 1063
Hedwig, married Engelbert I, Count of Spanheim (d. 1096)
Ida (d. 31 Jul 1102), married Frederick, Duke of Lower Lorraine (d. 1065) with the county of La Roche as a dowry, and Count Albert III of Namur

References

1000s births
1059 deaths
Year of birth uncertain